Jiang Pengxiang (born February 9, 1981, in Shenyang, Liaoning) is a Chinese football player.

Club career
Jiang Pengxiang played for various youth teams in Liaoning before moving to Changchun where he joined Changchun Yatai to start his professional football career. In 2001, he became a squad regular in an ambitious side looking for promotion to the top tier. He was involved in the 2001 China Jia B League Match Fixing scandal and received a ban of one year in 2002. Although the team won the 2003 league title there was no promotion that year and he had to wait until Changchun Yatai won promotion at the end of the 2005 league season. Playing in the top tier, he continued to establish himself at the heart of their midfield and proved his importance to the team when he aided them to a surprising fourth-place finish. In the following season, he continued to play his part in the team that went on to win the 2007 Chinese Super League title.

Honours
Chinese Super League: 2007
Chinese Jia B League: 2003

References

External links
Player profile at Changchun Yatai website
Profile at Sodasoccer
Player profile at sports.163.com
Profile at Sohu Sports

1981 births
Living people
Footballers from Shenyang
Association football midfielders
Chinese footballers
Changchun Yatai F.C. players
Chinese Super League players
China League One players